Flag-jacking is the act of travelers wearing a foreign flag on their clothing or backpack in an attempt to disguise the country they are visiting from; this occurs most prominently in cases where American tourists wear Canadian flags in an attempt to pass as Canadians. The intention is that by showing the flag of a country regarded favorably by the region they are visiting, they will receive friendlier treatment or service than they might otherwise have encountered.

Origin
The term flag-jacking gained additional popularity after an article entitled "How to Spot Flag-Jacking Frauds Abroad" was published on 1 July 2013 by The Huffington Post. The article stated that flag-jacking is a transitory act involving a person's use of a country's flag to create the false impression of being a citizen of a favored nation. The most common situation, according to the article, is when Americans pose as Canadians. Instances of flag-jacking date to the late 1990s.

Identification
Business Insider, CNN, FlightNetwork, and The Huffington Post have claimed it is possible to identify flag jackers by analysing their body language. In honor of Canada Day in 2013, FlightNetwork and their PR Agency (Pointman News Creation) commissioned Mark Bowden (of Truthplane) a top international body language expert, to provide humorous tips on how Americans can pass themselves off as Canadians by adopting gestures that he termed the "Maple-o-gy", the "Canuck Crinkle", the "Toque Tilt", the "Stars and Gripes Forever", the "Polka-Loon" and the "American Psycho".

References

Canadian English
Canadian slang
Deception
Flags